Beaverdam is an unincorporated community in Ripley County, in the U.S. state of Missouri.

History
A post office called Beaverdam was established in 1895, and remained in operation until 1897. The community takes its name from Beaverdam Creek.

References

Unincorporated communities in Ripley County, Missouri
Unincorporated communities in Missouri